The Owens Peak Wilderness is a    wilderness area comprising the rugged eastern face of the Sierra Nevada. Owens Peak (8,445 ft) is the high point. The land was set aside with the passage of the California Desert Protection Act of 1994 (Public Law 103–433) by the US Congress.

The mountainous terrain has deep, winding, open and expansive canyons, many of which contain springs with extensive riparian vegetation. This area is a transition zone between the Great Basin, Mojave Desert and Sierra Nevada ecoregions. Vegetation varies considerably with a creosote desert scrub community on the bajadas, scattered yuccas, cacti, annuals, cottonwood and oak trees in the canyons and valleys and a juniper-pinyon woodland with sagebrush and digger/gray pine on the upper elevations.

Wildlife includes mule deer, golden eagle and prairie falcon. Evidence of occupation by prehistoric peoples has been found throughout the wilderness.

The Pacific Crest Trail passes through the wilderness along the crest and western side.

Area restoration
Starting in 1992, an ongoing effort to restore the environment in both the Kiavah and Owens Peak wilderness areas is being conducted by the University of California, Davis, Student Conservation Corps. By March 1997,  of closed roads had been restored by relieving soil compaction with hand tools or a dozer-drawn ripper, installing waterbars, placing vertical mulch (woody debris and rocks) and scarifying disturbed area surfaces to increase water absorption and seed collection. Despite continued monitoring, illegal off-highway vehicle (OHV) use is a problem in some areas.

Mountain peaks
 Backus Peak
 Five Fingers (Aquila)
 Mount Jenkins
 Morris Peak
 Owens Peak
 Russell Peak

Notes

External links

 
Owens Peak Wilderness photos by BLM

Wilderness areas of California
Protected areas of the Mojave Desert
Protected areas of the Sierra Nevada (United States)
Protected areas of Inyo County, California
Protected areas of Tulare County, California
Protected areas of Kern County, California
IUCN Category Ib
Bureau of Land Management areas in California